The Pemex Executive Tower is a skyscraper in Mexico City. The  international style tower was built between 1979 and 1984. Since the building's opening, it has been occupied by state-owned Pemex, one of the largest petroleum companies in the world.

History
The Pemex Executive Tower originally proposed to replace two 14-story towers built between 1967 and 1970. Later, these buildings were replaced by a pair of 26-story towers to house Pemex's administrative offices. However, the 1980s oil boom demanded office space growth and Pemex decided to build a single 51-story tower in a downtown lot with a huge plaza covering an underground avenue. The building is anchored to the ground, resting on 164 concrete and steel piles that penetrate to a depth of 35 meters surpassing the old filling swampy lake to reach firmer ground. In addition, its x-braced structure features 90 shock-absorbers to minimize oscillations from earthquakes. The tower was completed in 1984, but the surrounding plaza was never completed.

As of January 2018, the Torre Pemex is the sixth tallest building in Mexico, and the fourth tallest in Mexico City. The tower is currently occupied by approximately 7,000 Pemex employees.

On 19 September 1985, the tower withstood a magnitude 8.1 earthquake, as well as other strong earthquakes that commonly strike Mexico City. The building was designed to withstand an earthquake of 8.5 on the Richter scale.

January 2013 explosion

On 31 January 2013, a powerful explosion rocked the tower, claiming 37 lives and injuring approximately 126. The explosion is believed to have occurred in the basement of the building's link to an adjacent building (which took the most damage). A gas leak and following accumulation ignited by sparks is believed to be the cause of the explosion. Employees said that the Torre Ejecutiva swayed and vibrated for a few seconds.

See also
List of tallest buildings in Mexico City

References

External links
 
 

Pemex
Skyscraper office buildings in Mexico City
Office buildings completed in 1984
1984 establishments in Mexico